Paul Rosenthal is an American community activist, teacher and politician who served in the Colorado House of Representatives from 2013 to 2019. He represented House District 9.

Rosenthal ran for re-election in 2018 but was eliminated in the Democratic primary, so he was not a candidate in the general election.

2020 RTD board election
In 2020, Rosenthal ran for a seat on Denver's Regional Transportation District board of directors. The board has fifteen elected members who serve four-year terms. Rosenthal was unopposed for the District E seat and won 63,442 votes, 100% of the votes cast.

References

External links
 Rosenthal's RTD board campaign website
 Paul Rosenthal's state house campaign website
 Legislative website

Members of the Colorado House of Representatives
LGBT state legislators in Colorado
Gay politicians
Living people
Politicians from Denver
21st-century American politicians
Year of birth missing (living people)
Jewish American state legislators in Colorado
21st-century American Jews